A partners desk, partner's desk or partners' desk (also double desk) is a mostly historical form of desk, a large pedestal desk designed and constructed for two users working while facing each other.  The defining features of a partner's desk are a deep top, two sets of drawers, one at each end of the pedestal, and usually the absence of a modesty panel (unless one has been added later).

When the desk is large the flat top is often fitted into frames at the tops of each pedestal, and lifts off to allow the desk to be lifted and moved through doorways as three pieces.  Most partners desks made in the 19th century were built of high quality woods such as oak, mahogany or walnut and finished with tooled leather inserts on top and brass fittings all around. Many reproductions have been made in the 20th century.

History

This piece of furniture was first conceived in the United Kingdom in the 18th century to accommodate the work of business partners; many businesses, including banks and industrial manufacturers, were formed as partnerships, as companies were very expensive to form.  As well as convenience, a partner's desk allowed each partner to keep an eye on the other, as the partners had joint and several liability for each other's actions.

The design evolved from 18th-century library writing tables with drawers on two or more sides.  This sort of desk-sharing became less common by the late 19th century, and though the desks were very often kept, they were usually only used by one person.

See also
 List of desk forms and types

References

External links 
 
examples of partners desks
Desks